PT Trans Media Corpora is an Indonesian media corporation that is a subsidiary of Trans Corp, a part of CT Corp, owned by Chairul Tanjung. Trans Media was initially founded as a subsidiary of Trans Corp, a liaison between the television network Trans TV and a network that had just taken over 55% ownership stake by CT Corp of Kompas Gramedia Group, Trans7 (formerly TV7).

Business units 
 PT Televisi Transformasi Indonesia (Trans TV)
 PT Duta Visual Nusantara Tivi Tujuh (Trans7)
 PT Trans News Corpora (CNN Indonesia) (licensed from Warner Bros. Discovery International)
 PT Trans Berita Bisnis (CNBC Indonesia) (licensed from NBCUniversal International Networks)
 PT Trans Digital Media (detik Network)
 PT Agranet Multicitra Siberkom (detikcom)
 HaiBunda.com
 Insertlive.com
 CNNIndonesia.com
 CNBCIndonesia.com
 PT Trans Media Sosial (TMS)
 PT Transinema Pictures
 PT SM Entertainment Indonesia
 PT Indonusa Telemedia (Transvision)
 Transvision Channels
 Golf Channel Indonesia
 Nusantara
 T-Music
 Dunia Anak
 Lingua Channel
 Bioskop Indonesia
 Jendela
 Insert
 SERU! Channel
 Dunia Lain
 Eat & Go
 Khazanah
 Historical Sports
 PT Trans Rekan Media
 PT Trans Entertainment
 PT Trans Event Produksi (Trans Event)

Branch offices

Surabaya 
On December 19, 2011, Vice Governor of East Java Saifullah Yusuf inaugurated Trans Corp's office at Jalan Jimerto No 17 A, Surabaya. This place becomes representative office for Trans TV, Trans7 and Detik.com in East Java.

Bandung 
On February 1, 2012, Bandung Mayor Dada Rosada inaugurated Trans Corp's office at Jalan Lombok No 33, Bandung. This office will become place of representative for Trans TV, Trans7 and DetikCom bureau Bandung.

References 

Indonesian companies established in 2013
Mass media companies established in 2013
 
Companies based in Jakarta
Mass media companies of Indonesia
Indonesian brands
CT Corp